Marko Cvetković (born 14 April 1977) is a Serbian professional basketball coach and former player, who is an assistant coach for Igokea of the ABA League.

Professional career 
A shooting guard and small forward, Cvetković played for Sloga, Zdravlje, NIS Vojvodina, Spartak, OKK Beograd, Crvena zvezda, Ergonom, Konstantin, and Lukoil Academic. He retired as a player with Konstantin in 2012.

Coaching career 
After retirement in 2012, Cvetković was hired as an assistant coach for club where he ended his playing career, Konstantin under head coach Boško Đokić. In March 2013, he got promoted as the head coach. Cvetković left the club after the end of the 2015–16 KLS season.

In November 2016, Cvetković was hired as the head coach for Handlová for the 2016–17 Slovak League.

In September 2017, Cvetković returned to Konstantin as the head coach. He resigned in December 2017. In August 2018, Cvetković was named the head coach of Konstantin for the third time. He resigned in November 2020.

In December 2020, Napredak Junior hired Cvetković as their new head coach. In June 2022, Cvetković became an assistant coach for Igokea m:tel.

In July 2022, Cvetković was an assistant coach for the Serbian under-20 national team that won a gold medal at the 2022 FIBA U20 European Championship Division B in Tbilisi, Georgia.

References

External links
 Marko Cvetkovic (Player) at eurobasket.com
 Marko Cvetkovic (Coach) at eurobasket.com
 Marko Cvetkovic at euroleague.net
 Marko Cvetkovic at proballers.com
 Marko Cvetkovic at aba-liga.com
 Marko Cvetkovic at realgm.com

1977 births
Living people
ABA League players
Basketball League of Serbia players
Basketball players from Niš
KK Crvena zvezda players
KK Ergonom players
KK Sloga players
KK Spartak Subotica players
KK Vojvodina Srbijagas players
KK Napredak Kruševac coaches
OKK Konstantin coaches
OKK Konstantin players
PBC Academic players
Serbian expatriate basketball people in Bosnia and Herzegovina
Serbian expatriate basketball people in Bulgaria
Serbian expatriate basketball people in Hungary
Serbian expatriate basketball people in Slovakia
Serbian men's basketball coaches
Serbian men's basketball players
Shooting guards
Small forwards